Courtney Scott "Court" McGee (born December 12, 1984) is an American mixed martial artist who competes in the Welterweight division of the Ultimate Fighting Championship. A professional MMA competitor since 2007, McGee mostly fought in local promotions in Utah before winning Spike TV's eleventh season of The Ultimate Fighter. As a recovering heroin addict, McGee actively gives talks on anti drug campaigns to teenagers and launched online "Hope 361" project to help addicts to the path of recovery.

Background 

Court McGee participated in high school wrestling at Layton High School placing 6th in the 5A State Division in 2002 and 3rd in the 5A State Division in 2003, under Mike Hansen. McGee also holds a background in karate, in which he has amassed over 100 kumite. After graduating from the high school, he attended Weber State University for a spell before dropping out due to lack of interest. In the early 2000s, McGee started taking painkillers in an attempt to find relief from an injury and began hanging out with the wrong crowd, a situation that would lead McGee to become addicted to heroin and cocaine. Following an overdose in which McGee was declared clinically deceased for eight minutes, he was resuscitated and as a result of the damage caused from temporary death to the brain, he had to learn how to walk and talk again. After rehab and getting himself cleaned up from substance abuse, McGee returned to Layton High School to become an assistant wrestling coach.  He later picked up Brazilian jiu-jitsu and boxing, and eventually transitioned into competing in MMA professionally.

Career

Boxing career
In addition to his Mixed Martial Arts career, McGee has also compiled a 2–0 record as a professional boxer in the cruiserweight division. Both fights took place in 2008, in between his MMA career.

His first fight was against Francisco Antonio Alacantara in May 2008. McGee defeated him via unanimous decision (40–35, 40–36, 39–36) in a four-round fight, having defeated Hank Weiss in an MMA fight just days earlier.

This was followed up by another unanimous decision victory (40–36, 40–36, 39–37) over Freddie Martinez. McGee revealed in June 2010 that this fight took place during his bachelor weekend.

Mixed martial arts career

Early career
McGee started his MMA career in 2007 in his home state of Utah, compiling a record of 10-1, with two technical knockouts and five submission wins. Two notable fights occurred during this period, with a submission win over DaMarques Johnson and a loss to Jeremy Horn.

In September 2008, McGee faced Isidro Gonzalez at the "Throwdown Showdown" event in Orem, Utah. McGee won the match after a unanimous decision. McGee was scheduled to compete in December 2008 against Ray Lazama for the Gladiator Challenge Middleweight title. However, the bout never transpired for unknown reasons. McGee instead faced Dayle Jarvis in July 2009. In what would turn out to be his final appearance on the local MMA circuit, McGee won by a Technical Knockout (TKO) over his opponent in under four minutes.

The Ultimate Fighter
In March 2010, McGee was announced as part of the eleventh season of The Ultimate Fighter. In the elimination round, McGee narrowly defeated Seth Baczynski after going to a sudden victory round. McGee was later picked by Chuck Liddell as his sixth pick and twelfth overall.

McGee was then defeated by the show's number one pick Nick Ring in the sixth preliminary fight. After two rounds, the judges declared the fight a victory for Ring via majority decision (20–18, 19–19, 20–18). Dana White and Chuck Liddell both stated that the fight should have gone to a third round.

When Rich Attonito broke his hand, his spot in the quarter-finals became open. Due to the controversial loss to Ring, White selected McGee to fight in his place. In the quarter-finals, McGee was set to have a rematch with Ring, but Ring pulled out of the competition due to a knee injury. James Hammortree stepped in as Ring's replacement. Early in the second round, McGee submitted Hammortree with a rare standing guillotine choke.

In the semi-finals he faced teammate Brad Tavares to earn a spot in the live finale. After a fairly even first two rounds, McGee dropped Tavares late in the third round with a left hook and locked in a fight-ending rear naked choke.

This advanced him to the TUF 11 finale where he faced Team Ortiz/Franklin fighter, Kris McCray in the main event. McGee spent half of his training camp away from his usual gym "Victory MMA", instead preferring to stick with his Ultimate Fighter coach, Chuck Liddell at The Pit. McGee defeated McCray by submission in the second round with a rear naked choke, making him the winner of the Ultimate Fighter Season 11, despite all the difficulties and bad luck he encountered on the show. McGee was also awarded the Submission of the Night award.

Ultimate Fighting Championship
McGee's first post-TUF fight was against UFC veteran, Ryan Jensen at UFC 121. Early in the first round, McGee was hit with a stiff shot that dropped him and later suffered a minor cut below his eye. In the second round, Jensen began to visibly tire and after being hit, began to bleed from the nose. McGee won the second round after a takedown just before the bell. In the third round, McGee successfully executed a takedown and a full mount, where he secured an arm triangle choke to force the tapout at 1:21 of the third round.

McGee was expected to face Jesse Bongfeldt on June 11, 2011 at UFC 131, but was reportedly forced out of the bout due to a knee injury. Matt Serra-trained fighter Chris Weidman stepped up to take McGee's place on the UFC 131 fight card against Bongfeldt.

McGee faced Yang Dongi on September 17, 2011 at UFC Fight Night 25. He won the fight via unanimous decision.

McGee faced Costas Philippou on March 3, 2012 at UFC on FX 2. He lost the fight via unanimous decision.

McGee fought Nick Ring in a rematch at UFC 149. McGee lost via a close unanimous decision. For the second time in a bout against Ring, the loss was regarded as controversial by many media sources. Stats after the fight showed that McGee outstruck Ring 32-25 in the second round and 53-16 in the final round. After the fight, McGee said "I felt like I had cage control, was more aggressive, out-struck him and attempted a submission in the third round. I should not have left it in the hands of the judges and finished the fight."

McGee made his welterweight debut against Josh Neer on February 23, 2013 at UFC 157. McGee was victorious, winning a unanimous decision after three rounds. According to Fightmetric, McGee broke the record for most significant strikes landed in a welterweight fight, landing 166 in the three round affair.

McGee faced fellow Ultimate fighter winner Robert Whittaker on August 28, 2013 at UFC Fight Night 27. He won the fight via split decision.

McGee was expected to face Kelvin Gastelum on December 14, 2013 at UFC on Fox 9.  However, Gastelum pulled out of the bout with a knee injury and was replaced by Ryan LaFlare. He lost the fight via unanimous decision.

Following his loss to Ryan LaFlare, McGee was out of action for over 18 months recovering from a litany of injuries. He returned to face Márcio Alexandre Jr. on December 12, 2015 at UFC 194. McGee won the fight by unanimous decision.

McGee faced Santiago Ponzinibbio on April 16, 2016 at UFC on Fox 19. He lost the bout via TKO in the first round.

McGee next faced Dominique Steele on August 6, 2016 at UFC Fight Night 92. He won the fight via unanimous decision.

McGee faced Ben Saunders on January 15, 2017 at UFC Fight Night 103. He lost the fight via unanimous decision.

McGee faced Sean Strickland on November 11, 2017 at UFC Fight Night 120. This fight was back and forth for all three rounds and was initially announced a majority draw with scores of 30-27, 29-29, 29-29. After the fight it was revealed there was an error in calculating the judges scorecards and Strickland was declared the winner by unanimous decision.

After an eleven-month hiatus due to shoulder injury and surgeries, McGee returned to face Alex Garcia on October 27, 2018 at UFC Fight Night 138. He won the fight by unanimous decision.

McGee faced Dhiego Lima on April 27, 2019 at UFC Fight Night: Jacaré vs. Hermansson. He lost the fight by split decision.

McGee faced promotional newcomer Sean Brady on October 18, 2019 at UFC on ESPN 6. He lost the fight via a unanimous decision.

McGee faced Carlos Condit on October 4, 2020 at UFC on ESPN: Holm vs. Aldana. He lost the fight via unanimous decision.

McGee faced Cláudio Silva on May 22, 2021 at UFC Fight Night 188 He won the fight via unanimous decision.

McGee faced Ramiz Brahimaj on January 15, 2022 at UFC on ESPN 32. He won the fight via unanimous decision.

McGee faced Jeremiah Wells on June 18, 2022 at UFC on ESPN 37. He lost the bout in the first round, getting knocked out by a left hook.

McGee is scheduled to face Matt Brown at UFC Fight Night 224 on May 13, 2023.

Personal life
McGee and his wife Chelsea  have three sons, Isaac, Crew Charles and Nash John (born 2021). The second son's middle name was taken from McGee's friend and Ultimate Fighter coach, Chuck Liddell's first name. McGee is of Irish and Scottish descent.

Heroin addiction 
McGee is a former heroin addict and in 2005, he was declared clinically dead after overdosing on heroin at his cousin's house before he was resuscitated. McGee had to learn to walk, speak and function again after his first overdose. McGee said that his path into drug and alcohol abuse began when he started to hang out with "the wrong people - drinking, partying." After suffering an injury to his clavicle and elbow, McGee became dependent to painkillers, which he later mixed with alcohol. McGee had taken cocaine and heroin before overdosing. After his near-death experience, McGee suffered a couple of relapses. On an episode of The Ultimate Fighter, McGee said "I took one drink in Vegas and I ended up in Iowa four days later with no pants on and a long sleeve shirt, looking for meth. I was strung out, the heroin addict, the drunk, the liar, the cheat, the thief. That's who I thought I was. I never thought I was going to amount to nothing."

Hope 361 project and addiction campaigner 

Since April 2006, McGee has been clean and uses his story to encourage those who may be struggling with addictions of their own. He launched an online project named "Hope 361" where addicts would share their stories and receive positive messages and connect addicts with rehabilitation facilities. McGee regularly visits prisons, rehab and youth correctional facilities, schools and churches and gives speeches on anti-drug campaigns and facilitate rehab programs to those who needed.

The McGee project 
The McGee Project was established in 2015 and McGee is the motivation speaker where he gives speeches and provide life-saving education to high school and university students, prisons and youth detention centers regarding the disease of addiction, recovery and positive decisions and goal-setting.

Championships and accomplishments
Ultimate Fighting Championship
The Ultimate Fighter 11 Middleweight Winner
Submission of the Night (One time)

Mixed martial arts record

|-
|Loss
|align=center|21–11
|Jeremiah Wells
|KO (punch)
|UFC on ESPN: Kattar vs. Emmett
|
|align=center|1
|align=center|1:34
|Austin, Texas, United States
|
|-
|Win
|align=center|21–10
|Ramiz Brahimaj
|Decision (unanimous)
|UFC on ESPN: Kattar vs. Chikadze
|
|align=center|3
|align=center|5:00
|Las Vegas, Nevada, United States
|
|-
|Win
|align=center|20–10
|Cláudio Silva
|Decision (unanimous)
|UFC Fight Night: Font vs. Garbrandt
|
|align=center|3
|align=center|5:00
|Las Vegas, Nevada, United States
|
|-
|Loss
|align=center|19–10
|Carlos Condit
|Decision (unanimous)
|UFC on ESPN: Holm vs. Aldana
|
|align=center|3
|align=center|5:00
|Abu Dhabi, United Arab Emirates
|
|-
|Loss
|align=center|19–9
|Sean Brady
|Decision (unanimous)
|UFC on ESPN: Reyes vs. Weidman
|
|align=center|3
|align=center|5:00
|Boston, Massachusetts, United States
|
|-
|Loss
|align=center|19–8
|Dhiego Lima
|Decision (split)
|UFC Fight Night: Jacaré vs. Hermansson
|
|align=center|3
|align=center|5:00
|Sunrise, Florida, United States
|
|-
|Win
|align=center|19–7
|Alex Garcia
|Decision (unanimous)
|UFC Fight Night: Volkan vs. Smith
|
|align=center|3
|align=center|5:00
|Moncton, New Brunswick, Canada
|
|-
|Loss
|align=center|18–7
|Sean Strickland
|Decision (unanimous)
|UFC Fight Night: Poirier vs. Pettis
|
|align=center|3
|align=center|5:00
|Norfolk, Virginia, United States
|
|-
|Loss
|align=center|18–6
|Ben Saunders
|Decision (unanimous)
|UFC Fight Night: Rodríguez vs. Penn
|
|align=center|3
|align=center|5:00
|Phoenix, Arizona, United States
|
|-
|Win
|align=center|18–5
|Dominique Steele 
|Decision (unanimous)
|UFC Fight Night: Rodríguez vs. Caceres
|
|align=center|3
|align=center|5:00
|Salt Lake City, Utah, United States
|
|-
|Loss
|align=center|17–5
|Santiago Ponzinibbio
|TKO (punches)
|UFC on Fox: Teixeira vs. Evans
|
|align=center|1
|align=center|4:15
|Tampa, Florida, United States
|
|-
|Win
|align=center|17–4
|Márcio Alexandre Jr.
|Decision (unanimous)
|UFC 194
|
|align=center|3
|align=center|5:00
|Las Vegas, Nevada, United States
|
|-
|Loss
|align=center|16–4
|Ryan LaFlare
|Decision (unanimous)
|UFC on Fox: Johnson vs. Benavidez 2
|
|align=center|3
|align=center|5:00
|Sacramento, California, United States
|
|-
|Win
|align=center|16–3
|Robert Whittaker
|Decision (split)
|UFC Fight Night: Condit vs. Kampmann 2
|
|align=center|3
|align=center|5:00
|Indianapolis, Indiana, United States
|
|-
|Win
|align=center|15–3
|Josh Neer
|Decision (unanimous)
|UFC 157
|
|align=center|3
|align=center|5:00
|Anaheim, California, United States
|
|-
|Loss
|align=center|14–3
|Nick Ring
|Decision (unanimous)
|UFC 149
|
|align=center|3
|align=center|5:00
|Calgary, Alberta, Canada
|
|-
|Loss
|align=center|14–2
|Costas Philippou
|Decision (unanimous)
|UFC on FX: Alves vs. Kampmann
|
|align=center|3
|align=center|5:00
|Sydney, Australia
|
|-
|Win
|align=center|14–1
|Yang Dongi
|Decision (unanimous)
|UFC Fight Night: Shields vs. Ellenberger
|
|align=center|3
|align=center|5:00
|New Orleans, Louisiana, United States
|
|-
|Win
|align=center|13–1
|Ryan Jensen
|Submission (arm-triangle choke)
|UFC 121
|
|align=center|3
|align=center|1:21
|Anaheim, California, United States
|
|-
|Win
|align=center|12–1
|Kris McCray
|Submission (rear-naked choke)
|The Ultimate Fighter: Team Liddell vs. Team Ortiz Finale
|
|align=center|2
|align=center|3:41
|Las Vegas, Nevada, United States
|
|-
|Win
|align=center|11–1
|Dayle Jarvis
|TKO (punches)
|Xtreme Combat 
|
|align=center|1
|align=center|3:47
|Richfield, Utah, United States
|
|-
|Win
|align=center|10–1
|Isidro Gonzalez
|Decision (unanimous)
|Throwdown Showdown 2: The Return
|
|align=center|1
|align=center|3:06
|Orem, Utah, United States
|
|-
|Win
|align=center|9–1
|Hank Weiss
|Decision (unanimous)
|JHEFN 2
|
|align=center|3
|align=center|5:00
|Salt Lake City, Utah, United States
|
|-
|Win
|align=center|8–1
|Chad Maheau
|TKO (punches)
|Kraze in the Cage: Chapter 7, Vol. 2
|
|align=center|1
|align=center|0:00
|Rock Springs, Wyoming, United States
|
|-
|Win
|align=center|7–1
|Clint Riser
|Submission (punches)
|Kraze in the Cage: Chapter 7, Vol. 1
|
|align=center|1
|align=center|0:00
|Rock Springs, Wyoming, United States
|
|-
|Loss
|align=center|6–1
|Jeremy Horn
|Decision (unanimous)
|UCE Round 28: Worlds Collide
|
|align=center|3
|align=center|5:00
|Salt Lake City, Utah, United States
|
|-
|Win
|align=center|6–0
|Justin Ellison
|Submission (punches)
|CFC 3
|
|align=center|1
|align=center|2:33
|Ogden, Utah, United States
|
|-
|Win
|align=center|5–0
|DaMarques Johnson
|Submission (guillotine choke)
|UCE Round 26: Finals
|
|align=center|3
|align=center|1:50
|St. George, Utah, United States
|
|-
|Win
|align=center|4–0
|Ben Fuimaono
|Submission (arm-triangle choke)
|UCE Round 26: Episode 9 Day 2
|
|align=center|3
|align=center|2:53
|Sandy, Utah, United States
|
|-
|Win
|align=center|3–0
|Jarrett Kelton
|TKO (punches)
|UCE Round 26: Episode 6 
|
|align=center|2
|align=center|1:40
|Ogden, Utah, United States
|
|-
|Win
|align=center|2–0
|Nick Rossborough
|Decision (unanimous)
|UCE Round 26: Episode 3 
|
|align=center|3
|align=center|5:00
|Sandy, Utah, United States
|
|-
|Win
|align=center|1–0
|Ry Stone
|Submission
|Bush Cree Promotions
|
|align=center|2
|align=center|1:06
|Grand Junction, Colorado, United States
|
|-

|-
|Win
|align=center|3–1
|Brad Tavares
|Technical submission (rear-naked choke)
|rowspan=4|The Ultimate Fighter: Team Liddell vs. Team Ortiz
|
|align=center|3
|align=center|4:45
|rowspan=4|Las Vegas, Nevada, United States
|
|-
|Win
|align=center|2–1
|James Hammortree
|Submission (standing guillotine choke)
|
|align=center|2
|align=center|0:28
|
|-
|Loss
|align=center|1–1
|Nick Ring
|Decision (majority)
|
|align=center|2
|align=center|5:00
|
|-
|Win
|align=center|1–0
|Seth Baczynski
|Decision (unanimous)
|
|align=center|3
|align=center|5:00
|

See also

 List of current UFC fighters
 List of male mixed martial artists

References

External links

The Ultimate Fighter winners
American male mixed martial artists
Mixed martial artists from Utah
Mixed martial artists utilizing karate
Mixed martial artists utilizing kajukenbo
Mixed martial artists utilizing boxing
Mixed martial artists utilizing Brazilian jiu-jitsu
Middleweight mixed martial artists
Welterweight mixed martial artists
Cruiserweight boxers
American male boxers
Sportspeople from Ogden, Utah
1984 births
Living people
American people of Irish descent
American people of Scottish descent
American male karateka
American practitioners of Brazilian jiu-jitsu
American kajukenbo practitioners
Ultimate Fighting Championship male fighters